Moffett, also spelled Moffitt, is an unincorporated community in Angelina County, in the U.S. state of Texas. According to the Handbook of Texas, the community had a population of 100 in 2000. It is located within the Lufkin, Texas micropolitan area.

History
The area in what is now known as Moffett today was first settled before 1900. The community had a sawmill, a store, a church, and several houses in the 1930s. Many residents left Moffett after World War II, but it had a church, a store, and a community center and was identified as a dispersed rural community in the early 1990s. It had a population of 100 in 2000.

Geography

Education
Moffett is served by the Lufkin Independent School District.

References

Unincorporated communities in Angelina County, Texas
Unincorporated communities in Texas